{{DISPLAYTITLE:Tau2 Serpentis}}

Tau2 Serpentis, Latinized from τ2 Serpentis, is a star in the constellation of Serpens, located approximately 480 light-years from the Sun. It is a challenge to view with the naked eye, having an apparent visual magnitude of 6.22. The star is drifting closer with a radial velocity of −19 km/s.

This object is a late B-type main-sequence star with a stellar classification of B9V. It is a probable Lambda Boötis star. The star is 278 million years old and is spinning with a projected rotational velocity of 154 km/s. It has nearly three times the mass and radius of the Sun. Tau2 Serpentis is radiating 96 times the Sun's luminosity from its photosphere at an effective temperature of 10,839 K.

There is evidence of a possible companion, which is contributing about 15% to the total emission of the system.

References

B-type main-sequence stars
Lambda Boötis stars

Serpens (constellation)
Serpentis, Tau2
Durchmusterung objects
Serpentis, 12
138527
076069
5770